Frederick Moore may refer to:

 Frederick Moore (Lancashire cricketer) (1931–2016), English cricketer
 Frederick Moore (Cambridge University cricketer) (1873–1947), English schoolmaster and cricketer
 Frederick Moore (politician), Republican member of the Montana legislature
 Frederick T. Moore Jr. (1914–1969), United States Navy captain
 Frederick Ferdinand Moore (1881–1947), American pulp fiction writer
 Frederick William Moore, keeper of the Royal Botanical Gardens, Dublin

See also
 Frederic Moore (1830–1907), British entomologist
 Fred Moore (disambiguation)